Jarrett Hurd (born August 31, 1990) is an American professional boxer. He is a former unified light middleweight world champion, having held the WBA (Super), IBF and IBO titles between 2017 and 2019. As of September 2019, Hurd is ranked as the world's second best active light middleweight by The Ring magazine, fourth best by the Transnational Boxing Rankings Board, and sixth by BoxRec.

Amateur career
Hurd was raised in the suburbs of Accokeek, Maryland and graduated from Gwynn Park High School. He wasn't a stand-out amateur, only compiling a 32–8 record in 40 amateur fights.

Professional career

Early career
Despite Hurd's lack of accolades as an amateur, Ross Molovinsky, head of Washington metropolitan area promotional outfit Keystone Boxing, tapped him as a potential prospect. Hurd made his pro debut in September 2012. After winning his first 16 fights, Hurd made his TV debut on ShoBox: The New Generation against fellow unbeaten prospect Frank Galarza. Hurd started off slow, however after round 2, outclassed Galarza, who was unable to cope with Hurd's jab and movement. After six lopsided rounds, the referee stopped the fight, giving Hurd a TKO win. Showtime analyst Steve Farhood praised Hurd's performance.

On May 19, 2016, it was announced that Hurd would appear on the Keith Thurman vs. Shawn Porter undercard at the Barclays Center in Brooklyn New York on June 25 against former Olympian Óscar Molina in a 10-round bout. The fight was initially on the non-televised undercard, until three days before the fight, it was bumped up to open the broadcast on CBS. The reason Hurd's fight was bumped up was due to the Jesús Cuellar vs. Abner Mares was cancelled after Mares suffered an eye injury. Hurd defeated Molina with a round 10 TKO. Hurd dropped Molina in the first round with an uppercut. The last round stoppage was considered premature by some media members. Before round 10, the three judges' had their scorecards reading 87–83, 88–82, 90–80 in favor of Hurd.

Hurd was scheduled to fight Jorge Cota in November 2016, but Cota dropped out after undergoing an emergency appendectomy and was replaced by Jo Jo Dan (35-3, 18 KOs). The bout took place on November 12 at Temple University's Liacouras Center in Philadelphia. Hurd won the fight with a round 6 TKO, overwhelming Dan with crisp combinations. After the fight, Dan said "The weight was a big difference, I took the fight on short notice, but I'm a natural 147-pounder and I don't struggle to make that."

IBF light middleweight champion

Hurd vs Harrison 
On January 24, 2017, it was announced that Hurd would next fight on Deontay Wilder's undercard on February 25 at the Legacy Arena in Birmingham, Alabama against Tony Harrison (24-1, 20 KOs) on PBC on FOX. The fight was originally supposed to be an IBF title eliminator for the right to fight Jermall Charlo, but when Charlo vacated the title, the fight was elevated to be for the vacant title. Hurd defeated Harrison to win the vacant IBF light middleweight title. Hurd struggled at the start of the fight, being outboxed in the early rounds. As the fight went on, Harrison seemed to struggle coping with Hurd's power. Harrison was knocked down by a right hook, he got up but was unable to continue. After the fight, Hurd said "We wanted to take our time with him because Harrison can box and move, but every time he fights, he wears down toward the end." Both boxers earned a $125,000 purse.

Hurd vs Trout 
On May 31, 2017, The Ring TV announced a deal was in place for Hurd to face former world champion Austin Trout for his first defense. The fight was scheduled for July 29 on the undercard of Mikey Garcia vs. Adrien Broner in New York. On July 20, Boxing Scene reported the fight was being lined up to take place on September 30, 2017, as part of a light middleweight double header alongside Jermell Charlo's WBC title defence against Erickson Lubin. Because Hurd was granted an exception from the IBF to make a voluntary defence the winner must fight mandatory challenger Cedric Vitu next. On August 24, it was announced that the fight would take place as part of a junior middleweight triple-header at the Barclays Center on 14 October 2017. On fight night, Trout started the fight well, winning the early rounds by jabbing and moving. However, during the third round, Hurd seemed to hurt Trout with some power shots. In the middle rounds, Hurd was able to stifle Trout's movement, making the fight more of a brawl, with both fighters trading power shots. Hurd seemed unfazed by Trout's punches, even though he seemed to tire during round 7. On the other hand, Trout was visibly backed up several times by Hurd's shots. Hurd was cut from a head clash during round 7, while Trout's right eye started swelling. Hurd backed up Trout once again towards the end of round 10. Trout's cornermen retired following round 10 to protect their fighter, to the chagrin of the former world champion. The announced attendance was 7,643. For the fight, Hurd earned $330,000, while Trout, who was stopped inside the distance for the first time since turning professional, was paid $225,000. In the action packed fight, Hurd landed 265 of 753 punches (35%) and Trout landed 208 of his 673 thrown (31%).

Unified light middleweight champion

Hurd vs Lara 
On January 9, 2018, it was confirmed that a deal was being put in place for a unification fight between Hurd and WBA (Super) and IBO champion Erislandy Lara (25-2-2, 14 KOs) for April 2018 with Showtime televising the bout. On January 25, the fight was confirmed to take place on April 7. It was reported Lara would receive a large purse of $1 million and Hurd would receive a $500,000 purse. Lara weighed 153.5 pounds and Hurd came in slightly lighter at 153 pounds. Hurd won a 12-round split decision over Lara in what was a potential fight of a year candidate to become a unified light middleweight champion. With the fight in the balance, Hurd knocked Lara down with a short left hook in round 12 with a minute remaining. Lara was hurt from the knockdown, but was able to get up and still throw some nice shots. Hurd dominated the final round. Two judges scored the fight 114-113 for Hurd and the third judge had the same score for Lara, meaning the knockdown was the deciding factor in the fight. A lot of rounds where close with Lara using effective counter punching and combinations, whereas Hurd used his size to stalk Lara and land power shots. Lara's right eye began to swell from round 7 and was eventually cut at the start of round 12. Lara started the fight the better boxer of the two, due to Hurd not putting as much pressure on Lara until the later rounds. With the win, Hurd became seventh unified world title holder in light middleweight history, joining Hall of Famers Terry Norris, Félix Trinidad, Oscar De La Hoya and Winky Wright, as well as Floyd Mayweather Jr. and Canelo Álvarez.

Despite the knockdown, Lara thought he had a good enough lead to win the fight. Had Lara not been knocked down, the fight would have finished a majority draw with both boxers keeping their respective belts. In regards to the decision, Lara said, "Besides the last round, I thought I was winning this fight easily. That's not to decide the fight. One punch in a fight doesn't determine the fight. One hundred percent I want the rematch. The problem was the cut on the eye. I couldn't see in the last round." After the fight, Hurd said, "It was a tough one, but I went out there and did exactly what I said I was going to do -- fight all 12 rounds and get the victory. I didn't feel like that [12th-round knockdown for the win]. I feel like I was in control the whole fight, applying the pressure." According to CompuBox statistics, Hurd landed 217 of 824 punches thrown (26%) and Lara landed 176 of his 572 thrown (31%). Hurd outlanded Lara 106–71 in the final four rounds, with 96 being power shots compared to Lara's 58 power punches. The fight, televised on Showtime, averaged 490,000 viewers and peaked at 521,000 viewers.

Although the WBA ordered a direct rematch between Lara and Hurd, the latter rejected the idea stating he wanted to move on to bigger fights to become undisputed light middleweight champion.

Hurd vs. Welborn 
In June 2018, Hurd underwent surgery on his shoulder, which he revealed was injured prior to his unification bout against Lara in April. In August, Hurd's trainer Ernesto Rodriguez stated the shoulder was healing well and he would look to return to the ring in November 2018. In October, it was announced that Hurd would return on the undercard of Deontay Wilder vs. Tyson Fury at the Staples Center in Los Angeles, California. His opponent was later confirmed to be British boxer Jason Welborn (24-6, 7 KOs), who would be dropping back down to light middleweight for the first time since 2016. Hurd weighed 152  pounds and his opponent Welborn came in at 152  pounds. For the fight, Hurd earned his first ever $1 million purse and Welborn would take home a $30,000 purse.

After rehydrating overnight to 172 pounds. Hurd knocked Welborn out in round 4 to retain his light middleweight titles. Welborn started to attack Hurd from the opening bell, pinning him against the ropes many times. Hurd looked hurt a couple of times during the short fight. Hurd, who was usually a slow starter, became more active in round 3. In the beginning of round 4, Welborn came out again landed shot whilst Hurd again against the ropes was taking head shots. Hurd managed to move away from the ropes and started trading back eventually landing a hard body shot which dropped Welborn. Welborn stayed down too long, and barely beat the count. However, the referee Lou Moret halted the fight due to Welborn taking too long getting up. The official time of stoppage was 1 minute and 56 seconds of round 4. During Hurd's post-fight interview with Showtime reporter Jim Gray, WBC champion Jermell Charlo entered the ring claiming a fight with Hurd would be 'easy money' and he was ready to fight him next. Speaking off his recent shoulder surgery and how the fight went, Hurd said, "I'm just coming of surgery so I wanted to see how I worked off the jab. I felt good I was working behind the jab.I got caught with some shots and said, 'That's enough. He got enough TV time.' I heard the crowd and I didn't want to get brave, so I turned it up and got the knockdown." Hurd stated he would call the shots in the negotiations against Charlo.

Hurd vs. Williams 
Hurd's next defence came on May 11, 2019, against Julian Wililams. Williams was ranked #1 by the IBF and #4 by the WBA at light middleweight. In what was a Fight of the Year candidate, both fighters came out aggressively. Williams managed to get the better out of Hurd, dropping him once in the second round, and outboxing Hurd on numerous occasions. All three judges saw Williams as the clear winner, scoring the fight 116–111, 115–112 and 115–112 to hand Hurd the first defeat of his professional career.

Hurd vs. Santana 
In his comeback fight on January 25, 2020, Hurd fought Francisco Santana. The fight revealed a changed Hurd, who fought more on the outside than on the inside. Hurd dominated the fight in every aspect, as he also managed to drop his opponent in the final round en route to a unanimous decision victory.

Hurd vs. Arias 
On June 6, 2021, Hurd faced Luis Arias on the undercard of Floyd Mayweather Jr. vs Logan Paul. Hurd knocked his opponent down in the ninth round, but lost the bout by split decision with scores of 95–94 in favor of Hurd, and 97–93, 96–93 in favor of Arias.

Professional boxing record

See also
List of light-middleweight boxing champions

References

External links

1990 births
Living people
American male boxers
African-American boxers
Boxers from Maryland
Sportspeople from the Washington metropolitan area
World light-middleweight boxing champions
International Boxing Federation champions
World Boxing Association champions
International Boxing Organization champions
People from Accokeek, Maryland
21st-century African-American sportspeople